(born May 14, ?) is a Japanese voice actress represented by VIMS.

Filmography

Television animation
AKB0048 (2012) (Shop clerk)
Nukko (2012) (Rakko)
Keijo (2016) (Miyo Harada)
Harukana Receive (2018) (Akane Ozora)
The Promised Neverland (2019) (Sister Krone)
Fruits Basket: The Final (2021) (Kazuma's Grandmother)

DVD animation
Marimo no Hana ~Saikyō Butō Hashō Gakusei Densetsu~ (2012) (Tetsu Nakamura)

Drama CD
Akiyama-kun (????) (Shiba's Mother)

Original net animation
JoJo's Bizarre Adventure: Stone Ocean (2021) (Tanned Prisoner)

Video games
Gal*Gun (2011) (Mari Amano, Natsuko Takizawa, Chōko Mita)
Time and Eternity (2012) (Additional voice)

Dubbing roles

Live-action
90210 (young Marla Templeton (Annie Little))
Emma's Chance (Lexi Smith (Christina Robinson)
Florence Foster Jenkins (Agnes Stark (Nina Arianda))
The Handmaid's Tale (Moira Strand (Samira Wiley))
The Hitman's Bodyguard (Amelia Roussel (Élodie Yung))
The Neon Demon (Gigi (Bella Heathcote))
The Night Before (Betsy Greenberg (Jillian Bell))
Nurse Jackie (Black paramedic)
Proven Innocent (Violet Bell (Nikki M. James))
A Star Is Born (Paulette Stone (Drena De Niro))
Tomb Raider (Mrs. Ahuja (Rekha John-Cheriyan))
The Trust (The Woman (Sky Ferreira))
The Wailing (Moo-myung (Chun Woo-hee))
The White Queen (Elizabeth Woodville (Rebecca Ferguson))

Animation
My Little Pony: Friendship Is Magic (Zecora, Sapphire Shores)

References

External links
VIMS profile 

Year of birth missing (living people)
Living people
Voice actresses from Nara Prefecture
Japanese video game actresses
Japanese voice actresses
21st-century Japanese actresses